Oktawia Płomińska (born 5 October 1998) is a Polish handballer for MKS Lublin and the Polish national team.

She participated at the 2021 World Women's Handball Championship in Spain, placing 15th.

Achievements
Puchar Polski:
Finalist: 2018, 2019
EHF Challenge Cup:
Finalist: 2019

References

External links

1998 births
Living people
People from Piotrków Trybunalski
Polish female handball players
21st-century Polish women